Marianne is a weekly Paris-based French news magazine founded in 1997 by Jean-François Kahn and Maurice Szafran. Its political lean has been described as left-wing sovereigntist. Its redaction chief has been Natacha Polony since 2018.

History and profile
Marianne was created in 1997 by Jean-François Kahn with Maurice Szafran as editorialist. It takes its name from an earlier, now defunct magazine. The main shareholder was the company of Robert Assaraf with 49.4% of the shares. Czech Media Invest, owner of Czech News Center, acquired most of the magazine from Yves de Chaisemartin in 2018.

Marianne claims a circulation of 300,000 copies per week, reaching a peak of 580,000, with the French news magazine record-breaker "The Real Sarkozy" in April 2007. During the period of 2007–2008 the circulation of the magazine was 275,000 copies. It was 264,000 copies in 2010 and about 146,000 in late 2016.

2007 presidential election

During the 2007 French presidential election Mariannes editors Jean-François Kahn, Maurice Szafran and Nicolas Domenach openly supported the centre-right candidate François Bayrou, although at the same time they exposed "the editors' favourite" and advocated for French Socialist Party candidate Ségolène Royal.

Furthermore, they conducted a strong anti-Sarkozy campaign in the magazine including a special issue released on April 14~20 (#521), the day before the vote, arguing that right-wing candidate Nicolas Sarkozy was "insane" (which was the title of a previous issue) in a negative portrait "of all dangers" (de tous les dangers). Such aggressive practice rather common in Great Britain and the United States is unusual in France.

Issue #521 "The Real Sarkozy" (Le Vrai Sarkozy) was named after the popular anti-Sarkozy propaganda video first released on July 5, 2006 in online services – as Dailymotion (+2,132,686 views) French counterpart of YouTube (+927,770) – by left wing supporters group RéSo (close to the French Socialist Party's Dominique Strauss-Kahn wing) author of the "AntiSarko" 2005 online campaign, which became the magazine's best seller (580,000 copies). It was since then made online for free in the magazine's website. The issue sold well with an exceptional out of print and two reprints, but some journalists argued that the criticisms against Sarkozy actually strengthened Sarkozy's supporters per the victimization process.

The previous issue's (#520) cover titled "Sarkozy's fault: he chose Bush's America against Chirac's France" (La faute de Sarkozy: Il choisit l'Amérique de Bush contre la France de Chirac) as a reference to Sarkozy having been one of the few French politicians initially supporting the 2003 invasion of Iraq which has been described by the French far-left and left-wing as a "fault", as well as by a part of the Gaullist right-wing as a "mistake".

See also
 Marianne, the publication's namesake and symbol of France

References

External links
 Official website

1997 establishments in France
French-language magazines
Magazines established in 1997
Magazines published in Paris
News magazines published in France
Political magazines published in France
Weekly magazines published in France